Anton Deusing, in Latin Antonius Deusingius (October 15, 1612 – January 30, 1666) was a German physician, mathematician, and astronomer.

Life 

Born in Moers in 1612, Deusing was an educated German physician, scholar of Oriental language, philosophy, physics, mathematics and astronomy. Between 1630 and 1637 he was enrolled at the University of Leiden, where he became a protégé of Jacobus Golius, the famous professor of Oriental Languages and Mathematics. In 1646 he became the first professor of medicine at the University of Groningen. He wrote and published several works in Latin. He died in Groningen in 1666.

Works 
 
 The Universal Theatre of Nature (1645)
 Synopsis of Medicine (1649)
 The Economy of the Animal System (1660)

References 

17th-century German astronomers
17th-century German mathematicians
17th-century German physicians
1666 deaths
1612 births
17th-century German writers
17th-century German male writers